The Three Masks (French: Les trois masques) is a 1929 French film directed by André Hugon and starring Renée Héribel, Jean Toulout and François Rozet. Produced by Pathé the film is considered to be a candidate for France's first talking picture, but was made in Britain. As no French studio had yet been converted for sound, it was shot at Twickenham Studios in London. The first talking picture produced in France is probably Pierre Colombier's , although The Queen's Necklace produced by Pathe's rival Gaumont is also considered a contender.

The first American sound films had premiered in Europe, followed by Alfred Hitchcock's Blackmail in 1929. Producer Julius Hagen was quick in overhauling the studios at Twickenham for sound and providing sound stages for rent to both British and Continental producers. The film's sets were designed by the art director Christian-Jaque. The film is based on the 1908 play of the same title by Charles Méré, which had previously been made into a 1921 silent The Three Masks by Henry Krauss.

Synopsis
In Corsica two brothers decide to take revenge against the young man who has got their sister pregnant, unaware that he is trying to marry her in the face of his father's opposition. They stab him while all three are wearing masks for a carnival.

Cast
 Renée Héribel as Viola Vescotelli 
 Jean Toulout as Pratti Della Corba  
 François Rozet as Paolo  
 Marcel Vibert as Vescotelli  
 Paul Azaïs as Le fils Vescotelli 
 Henri Bargin 
 Rachel Boyer 
 Pierre Geay 
 Michel Kovachevitch 
 Clotilde Person as La tante Della Corba  
 Louis Rouyer as Un masque

References

Bibliography
 Crisp, C.G. The Classic French Cinema, 1930-1960. Indiana University Press, 1993 
 Lanzoni, Rémi Fournier . French Cinema: From Its Beginnings to the Present. A&C Black, 2004.
 Rège, Philippe. Encyclopedia of French Film Directors, Volume 1. Scarecrow Press, 2009.
 Williams, Alan Larson. Republic of Images: A History of French Filmmaking. Harvard University Press, 1992.

External links

1929 films
Films directed by André Hugon
1920s French-language films
Transitional sound films
Remakes of French films
Sound film remakes of silent films
French films based on plays
French black-and-white films
Pathé films
Films shot at Twickenham Film Studios
1920s French films